Rufat Ahmadov (born on 22 September 2002) is an Azerbaijani professional footballer who plays as a defender for Gabala in the Azerbaijan Premier League.

Career

Club
On 23 August 2020, Ahmadov made his debut in the Azerbaijan Premier League for Gabala match against Zira.

Career statistics

Club

References

External links
 

2002 births
Living people
Association football defenders
Azerbaijani footballers
Azerbaijan youth international footballers
Azerbaijan Premier League players
Gabala FC players